John Vallance may refer to:
 John Vallance (cricketer)
 John Vallance (politician)